Serigne Fall (born 1960) is a Guinean boxer. He competed in the men's featherweight event at the 1988 Summer Olympics.

References

1960 births
Living people
Guinean male boxers
Olympic boxers of Guinea
Boxers at the 1988 Summer Olympics
Place of birth missing (living people)
Featherweight boxers